Glenea omeiensis is a species of beetle in the family Cerambycidae. It was described by Chiang in 1963.

References

omeiensis
Beetles described in 1963